Jonas Fedl (born 5 February 1999) is a German professional footballer who plays as a midfielder for  club SV Meppen.

Career
Fedl started his youth career at TuS Koblenz before joining Mainz 05 in 2015. He made his senior debut for Mainz 05 II in March 2019. After 64 appearances and five goals for Mainz 05 II, he signed for 3. Liga club SV Meppen on a two-year contract in June 2021.

References

External links

1999 births
Living people
German footballers
People from Andernach
Footballers from Rhineland-Palatinate
Association football defenders
3. Liga players
Regionalliga players
TuS Koblenz players
1. FSV Mainz 05 II players
SV Meppen players